This is a list of fictional humanoid species in comics, and is subsidiary to the Lists of humanoids. It is a collection of various notable humanoid species that are featured in comics, including weekly or daily comic strips, comic book publications or manga.

References

Comics